GREGOR is a solar telescope, equipped with a 1.5 m primary mirror, located at 2,390 m altitude at the Teide Observatory on Tenerife in the Canary Islands. It replaces the older Gregory Coudé Telescope and was inaugurated on May 21, 2012.

GREGOR is the third-largest solar telescope in the world, after the Big Bear Observatory and the McMath-Pierce solar telescope. It is aimed at observing the solar photosphere and chromosphere at visible and infrared wavelengths. GREGOR sports a high-order adaptive optics (AO) system with a 256-actuator deformable mirrors and a 156-subaperture Shack-Hartmann wavefront sensor. Efforts are underway to implement multi-conjugate AO in 2014.

2014-2020

2020 upgrade
Initial astigmatism was fixed during an upgrade with some corrective optics: two off-axis parabolic mirrors.

See also 

 
 
 
 
List of solar telescopes

References

Sources
 

Solar telescopes
Buildings and structures in Tenerife